Michael Ratu (born 16 October 1987) is a Fiji international rugby league footballer who plays as a  for the Swinton Lions in the Betfred Championship. 

Background
Ratu was born in Rochdale, Greater Manchester, England, and played junior rugby at Rochdale Mayfield

Playing career
Before joining Leeds, he played for Higgleshaw Cagies, playing for them when they won the Oldham Cup. He also played for Wigan Academy. He signed a three-year contract with Leeds, despite Wigan offering him a new contract. He played for Leeds' academy from 2004. Although he played for Leeds' first team, he mostly played in the academy. He played for the Fiji in the 2009 Pacific Cup.
Ratu later signed a two-year deal with Hull Kingston Rovers.
In 2012, Ratu signed for Rochdale.

Outside rugby
Ratu was schooled at Falinge Park High School near Shawclough, Rochdale.

Honours
He has represented England U15s ad U16s and has also played for Lancashire and Fiji.

References

1987 births
Living people
English people of I-Taukei Fijian descent
English rugby league players
Fiji national rugby league team players
Halifax R.L.F.C. players
Hull Kingston Rovers players
Leeds Rhinos players
People educated at Falinge Park High School
Rochdale Hornets players
Rugby league centres
Rugby league players from Rochdale
Swinton Lions players
Wigan Warriors players